Khaniabad may refer to:
 Khaniabad, Chaharmahal and Bakhtiari
 Khaniabad, Tehran